The 2004–05 Austrian Hockey League season was the 75th season of the Austrian Hockey League, the top level of ice hockey in Austria. Seven teams participated in the league, and the Vienna Capitals won the championship.

Regular season

Playoffs

External links
Austrian Ice Hockey Association

Aus
1
Austrian Hockey League seasons